The 2021 World Series of Poker (WSOP) was the 52nd edition of the event. It took place from September 30 – November 23 at the Rio All-Suite Hotel and Casino in Las Vegas, Nevada.

A full schedule of 88 live events (plus 11 online events) was held after the 2020 WSOP was canceled due to the COVID-19 pandemic. The $10,000 No Limit Hold'em Main Event began on November 4, with the champion being determined on November 17.

New events included a $1,000 Flip and Go No Limit Hold'em Tournament, where each player was automatically all-in on the first hand and the winners of the hand will proceed into the money and a traditional tournament structure. There was also be a Poker Hall of Famers Bounty tournament. Each member of the Poker Hall of Fame was invited to play as a freeroll and had a bounty placed on them, with the buy-in for other players $1,979 in honor of the Hall of Fame opening in 1979.

The WSOP also held another version of the World Series of Poker Online, which was first held in 2020, beginning on July 1.

Event schedule

Source:

Key: (bracelet number for 2021/bracelet number for career)

Player of the Year
Final standings as of November 23 (note: does not include events from the 2021 WSOP Online series or the 2021 WSOP Europe series):

Main Event

The $10,000 No Limit Hold'em Main Event began on November 4.

Performance of past champions

*- Denotes player who finished in the money

Final Table

*Career statistics prior to the Main Event

Final Table results

References

External links
Official website

World Series of Poker
World Series of Poker
World Series of Poker
World Series of Poker